Upton Township is a township in Texas County, in the U.S. state of Missouri.

Upton Township was erected in 1852, taking its name from Osias Upton, who at the time was active local politics.

References

Townships in Missouri
Townships in Texas County, Missouri